Poland competed at the 1960 Summer Olympics in Rome, Italy. 185 competitors, 156 men and 29 women, took part in 108 events in 17 sports.

Gold
 Zdzisław Krzyszkowiak — Athletics, men's 3000 metres steeplechase
 Józef Szmidt — Athletics, men's Triple jump
 Kazimierz Paździor — Boxing, men's Lightweight
 Ireneusz Paliński — Weightlifting, men's Light-heavyweight

Silver
 Elżbieta Krzesińska — Athletics, women's Long jump
 Jarosława Jóźwiakowska — Athletics, women's High jump
 Jerzy Adamski — Boxing, men's Featherweight 
 Tadeusz Walasek — Boxing, men's Middleweight
 Zbigniew Pietrzykowski — Boxing, men's Light heavyweight 
 Andrzej Piatkowski, Emil Ochyra, Wojciech Zabłocki, Jerzy Pawłowski, Ryszard Zub, Marian Kuszewski, — Fencing, men's team sabre

Bronze
 Kazimierz Zimny — Athletics, men's 5000 metres
 Tadeusz Rut — Athletics, men's Hammer throw
 Teresa Wieczorek, Barbara Janiszewska, Celina Jesionowska, Halina Richter — Athletics, women's 4×100 metres relay
 Brunon Bendig — Boxing, men's Bantamweight
 Marian Kasprzyk — Boxing, men's Light welterweight
 Leszek Drogosz — Boxing, men's Welterweight 
 Daniela Walkowiak — Canoeing, women's K-1 500 metres
 Stefan Kapłaniak, Władysław Zieliński — Canoeing, men's K-2 1000 metres
 Teodor Kocerka — Rowing, men's single sculls
 Jan Bochenek — Weightlifting, men's Light-heavyweight
 Tadeusz Trojanowski — Wrestling, men's Freestyle Bantamweight

Athletics

Men
Track & road events

Field events

Women
Track & road events

Field events

Basketball

Roster

Andrzej Nartowski
Andrzej Pstrokoński
Bohdan Przywarski
Dariusz Świerczewski 

Janusz Wichowski
Jerzy Młynarczyk
Jerzy Piskun
Krzysztof Sitkowski

Mieczysław Łopatka
Ryszard Olszewski
Tadeusz Pacuła
Zbigniew Dregier

Preliminary round
Group D

Semifinals
Pool A

Classification 5–8

Boxing

Men

Canoeing

Sprint
Men

Women

Cycling

Five male cyclists represented Poland in 1960.
Road

Diving

Men

Equestrian

Eventing

Fencing

21 fencers, 16 men and 5 women, represented Poland in 1960.

Men

Women

Football

Roster

Coach: Czesław Krug

Lucjan Brychczy
Eugeniusz Faber
Stefan Florenski
Stanisław Fołtyn 
Zygmunt Gadecki
Ryszard Grzegorczyk
Henryk Grzybowski

Stanisław Hachorek
Engelbert Jarek
Roman Lentner
Marian Norkowski
Hubert Pala
Ernest Pol

Henryk Szczepański
Edward Szymkowiak
Tomasz Stefaniszyn
Marceli Strzykalski
Edmund Zientara 
Jerzy Woźniak

Group play
Group C

Final ranking

Gymnastics

Artistic
Men

Women

Field hockey

Roster

Alfons Flinik
Czesław Kubiak
Henryk Flinik
Jan Flinik
Jan Górny

Kazimierz Dąbrowski
Leon Wiśniewski
Narcyz Maciaszczyk
Roman Micał
Ryszard Marzec

Władysław Śmigielski
Włodzimierz Różański
Zdzisław Wojdylak

Preliminary round

Group B

Group standings

Pakistan advanced to the quarter-finals.  Australia and Poland played a tie-breaker match to determine second place in the group.  Japan continued to the classification matches for 13th–16th place.

Australia advanced to the quarter-finals. Poland continued to the classification matches for 9th–12th place.

Ninth to twelfth place
Poland declined to participate in the classification matches and was therefore awarded twelfth place. The other three teams played a round-robin set of matches.

Modern pentathlon

Three male pentathletes represented Poland in the 1960 Games.

Rowing

Poland had five male rowers participate in two out of seven rowing events in 1960.

Men

Shooting

Men

Swimming

Men

Weightlifting

Men

Wrestling

Men's freestyle

Men's Greco-Roman

References

External links
Official Olympic Reports
International Olympic Committee results database

Nations at the 1960 Summer Olympics
1960
1960 in Polish sport